James Y. Chao (born 1947) is an American chemical industry executive, chair of the Westlake Chemical Corporation and the Westlake Chemical Partners LP Board of Directors. In 2019, James and Albert Chao received the Petrochemical Heritage Award as part of the International Petrochemical Conference.

Early life
James Yuan Chao was born on September 14, 1947 and grew up in Taiwan. His father was born in China and moved to Taiwan with his family in 1946. In the mid-1980s, Chao's family moved from Taiwan to the U.S.

Education
James Chao received a bachelor in science from Massachusetts Institute of Technology and an M.B.A. from Columbia University.

Companies
In 1986 T.T. Chao and his sons James Chao and Albert Chao founded  Westlake Chemical, the largest manufacturer of low-density polyethylene in the US. 
James Chao served as President of Westlake Chemicals from 1986 to 1996; as Vice Chairman of the Board of Westlake Chemicals from May 1996 to July 2004; and as Chairman beginning in July 2004. Albert and James' sister, Dorothy Chao Jenkins, also serves on the board of Westlake Chemicals. James' son Donald Chao became a director of Westlake Chemical Corporation as of January 2018.

The Chao family also founded Suzhou Huasu Plastics Company in China as of 1993, and Titan Chemicals Corporation in Malaysia as of 1998.
James Chao was the managing director of Titan from 1988 to 2003, and the company's chair and director from 2003 to 2010.

References

1947 births
Living people
Place of birth missing (living people)
American people of Taiwanese descent
American chief executives
American company founders
Columbia Business School alumni